Gymnasium Gaussschule is a Gymnasium (high school) in Braunschweig, Lower Saxony, Germany.

History
The school was founded in 1909. From 1933 to 1944 the number of students dropped from 415 to 244, under pressure from the Nazi regime. In 2005, a planetarium was opened in the school.

Notable alumni and teachers
 Theodor Stiebel, founder of Stiebel Eltron
 Hans Jäcker was teaching Latin and sports after his career as football player
 Günter Gaus Journalist-Diplomat

See also 
 List of schools in Germany

References

External links 
 school website (in German)

Education in Braunschweig
Educational institutions established in 1909
Gymnasiums in Germany
Schools in Lower Saxony
1909 establishments in Germany
Organisations based in Braunschweig